Meton is a compound formation on the Moon that consists of several merged crater rings that have been flooded with lava, forming the remnant of a walled plain in the shape of a clover leaf. It is located near the northern lunar limb, and is viewed from a low angle and foreshortened. The crater Barrow is attached to the southwest rim. To the northwest is the crater Scoresby, and to the east are Baillaud and Euctemon.

Satellite craters
By convention these features are identified on lunar maps by placing the letter on the side of the crater midpoint that is closest to Meton.

References

 
 
 
 
 
 
 
 
 
 
 
 

Impact craters on the Moon